Clytra bodemeyeri is a species of leaf beetles in the subfamily Cryptocephalinae that can be found in Asia Minor and Iraq.

References

Beetles described in 1900
Beetles of Asia
Clytrini
Taxa named by Julius Weise